Boris Ivanovich Skrynnik (born 15 July 1948  in Arkhangelsk) is a Russian bandy executive and former bandy player. He has been the president of the Federation of International Bandy. He is also president of the Russian Bandy Federation (Федерация хоккея с мячом России).

After the 2022 Russian invasion of Ukraine, Skrynnik first said he would continue to lead the Federation of International Bandy, saying: "I'm not going to suspend my Presidency. If someone wants, let them gather a quorum, and I'll suspend it." However, at the FIB annual congress in October 2022, he had changed his mind and voluntarily stepped down. He was succeeded by Stein Pedersen from Norway.

References

External links
 
 

Federation of International Bandy presidents
Russian bandy executives
Soviet bandy players
Vodnik Arkhangelsk players
1948 births
Living people
Sportspeople from Arkhangelsk